Kid Cosmic is an American animated superhero television series created by Craig McCracken and developed by McCracken, Francisco Angones, and Lauren Faust for Netflix. The show is based on his 2009 comic The Kid From Planet Earth. Produced in-house by Netflix Animation, the show is McCracken's first to have a serialized format, as well as his second foray into the superhero genre, having previously created The Powerpuff Girls. Illustrated in a "retro 2D" style inspired by comics such as Dennis the Menace and The Adventures of Tintin, the series follows Kid, a young boy who gets a chance to become a superhero and fight evil aliens alongside other characters with different abilities.

The first season of the series was released on February 2, 2021. The second season, subtitled The Intergalactic Truckstop!, was released on September 7, 2021. The third and final season, subtitled The Global Heroes!, was released on February 3, 2022.

Plot 
Kid Cosmic follows Kid, a young boy who naïvely fantasizes about becoming a superhero, living in a junkyard in a thinly populated stretch of desert in New Mexico. When a spaceship crashes in the area, he discovers it has onboard five "Cosmic Stones of Power" that give him the chance of fulfilling his dream. When the stones attract alien invasions, he forms a motley team of superheroes to defend the Earth from them. This team, with each member having a stone giving them a unique power, consist of Kid's grandpa, George "Papa G" Mulligan (Old Man Many Men), who can create multiple clones of himself; Kid's friend Jo (Portal Girl), who has the ability to teleport; Rosa (Niña Gigantica), a four-year-old girl who can become a 40-foot giant; and Tuna Sandwich (The Precognitive Cat), a cat that can predict the future with a third eye on his forehead. They are accompanied by Stuck Chuck, an alien invader stranded on Earth after the destruction of his ship. Stuck Chuck's mission is to steal the Cosmic Stones for his Great Leader.

In the second season, the Local Heroes are teleported into space and have to go on a quest to find the other eight Stones of Power to fight against Erodius the Planet Killer.

In the third and final season, the Local Heroes, now the Global Heroes, find out that there is actually a fourteenth silver Cosmic Stone of Power of healing, and learn further revelations about Erodious and the world they're currently in, requiring that they must make great sacrifices.

Voice cast

Main
 Jack Fisher as Kid, a nine year-old kid who finds the first five Stones of Power and uses them to fulfill his dream of being a superhero. His real name is Kid Mulligan. He is an orphaned kid living with his grandfather, George "Papa G" Mulligan, in a junkyard where he spends time reading comics and collecting curious stuff from the yard. He is motivated to be a superhero after his parents died in a car collision and feels that having powers would have allowed him to save them. In the first season, he tried to dominate the use of the green Stone of Power which he initially thought was for flying until it is later revealed to have telekinetic powers. After losing this stone to Fantos in the second season, he uses the olive green Stone that transforms him into a slime form to the disgust of him and the rest of the gang. In the third season, he mastered the use of the Green Stone to the point of slowing down Erodius and prevents it from hitting Earth.
 Amanda C. Miller as Johanna "Jo", a teenage waitress at Mo's Oasis and Kid's best friend who dreams of seeing the world, and is granted the power of portal creation by the purple Stone of Power. Her hero name is Portal Girl and she is also leader of the team. In the second season, she has to prove her leadership abilities by leading the Local Heroes to find the remaining stones and confronting Erodius. In season 3, she found out her power stone doesn't just create portals to places she can think of, but also to places she can imagine.
 Lily Rose Silver as Rosa Flores, a Mexican-American four-year-old girl who is granted the power to enlarge herself to gigantic proportions by the blue Stone of Power. Her hero name is La Niña Gigantica, which is Spanish for "The Gigantic Girl". She is the daughter of Ramona and Carlos Flores and an energetic girl that is devoted to help Kid and Jo in their adventures despite her short age, going to the point of recovering the Power Stones by herself. As a regular girl, she loves dinosaurs and princesses.
 Tom Kenny as Stuck Chuck, an alien who is among the first to try to steal the Stones of Power from Kid and ends up stuck with Kid's group when, as a result, he loses both his ship and legs. His name is a nickname thought up by Jo since his real name was never revealed, and he was also the one who caused the spaceship with the first five Stones of Power to crash on Earth. Initially seeking any opportunity to get the stones for his Great Leader, he reforms near the end of the first season by also providing his translator to Tuna Sandwich because he began to understand English. In season two, he works as a dishwasher in Mo's Oasis and gains the dark blue Stone of Power, granting him pain absorption. Similar to Kid, he also likes to read comics.
 Fred Tatasciore as Tuna Sandwich, a cat who resides at Mo's Oasis and to whom Kid gives the red Stone of Power, granting him the power to see glimpses of the future. His hero name is The Precognitive Cat. Tuna wears a high-tech collar that translates his speech into English, given to him by Chuck as of "The Invaders from Earth".
 Keith Ferguson as:
 George "Papa G", Kid's hippie grandfather who encourages Kid to find nonviolent solutions to his problems, and is granted the power to clone himself by the yellow Stone of Power. His hero name is Old Man Many Men. His design and personality are very similar to Wander from McCracken's third animated series, Wander Over Yonder. In the third and final season, he is revealed to be 112 years old, as he kept the silver Stone of Power, which grants the wielder instantaneous healing abilities since he found it as a child and it has kept him healthy ever since. But once he returned the silver stone to Erodius, his vitality disappeared and he became weak and decrepit to the point where he now needs a wheelchair to move around, as his age finally caught up with him.
 Carl, a trucker and regular at Mo's Oasis. In the second season, he gains the ability to turn invisible through the turquoise Stone of Power.
 Kim Yarbrough as Florence "Flo", Jo's mother and proprietor of Mo's Oasis. She tries to keep her business floating even when dealing with Kid Cosmic's antics, including having her diner in space. Despite that, she decides to support Jo, even if she prefers to get mentorship from Queen Xhan. She tends to use several of the Power Stones Jo finds in the second season while she never dominates the use of one. However, in the third and final season, she dominates the use of the olive green Stone, even to the point to stop Fantos a little.

Supporting
 Christian Lanz as:
Carlos Flores, Rosa's father and a regular at Mo's Oasis and Ramona's husband. He and his wife run a successful floral business. In the second season, he gains the white Cosmic Stone of Power, which grants the user the ability to breathe ice.
Carlax, an intergalactic postal worker who had been delivering the first five Stones to Fantos until he was shot down by Chuck. He later becomes a regular at Mo's after being reunited with his family and is the first customer to arrive when the Oasis reopens in Earth.
 Grey Griffin as:
 Carla, a biker and regular at Mo's Oasis. She becomes part of the Local Heroes by getting the pink Cosmic Stone of Power that allows her to run at super speed.
 Ramona Flores, Rosa's mother and a regular at Mo's Oasis and the wife of Carlos. In the second season, she gains the orange Cosmic Stone of Power, which grants the user the ability to breathe fire.
 Cadet Vinia
 Boss Fiosa, an evil two-headed alien crime boss who possessed the orange and white Stones of Power before the Local Heroes pulled off a heist to take them from her.
 Jason Hightower as Biker in Black, the leader of Earth Force Enforcement Force who believes all aliens who come to Earth are hostile. After his defeat in the first season, he plots revenge by building a giant robot to take down the Local Heroes, but was soon defeated afterwards (though this was later revealed to have occurred in the Fantasy Realm).
 Earth Force Enforcement Force consists of Lanz as Crimson Vision, Griffin as Violet Vanish, Eric Bauza as Emerald Wing, Phil LaMarr as Golden Swarm, and Michaela Dietz as Blue Behemoth. Their colors correspond to the powers granted by the Stones of Power. They follow the Biker in Black's orders to dispose of all aliens on Earth, but when their suits are destroyed at the end of the first season, they reform themselves.
 Cree Summer as Queen Xhan, a purple jellyfish-like alien who is the former bearer of the purple Stone of Power. She ends up being the only survivor of her group of friends at the end because of Erodius the Planet Killer. She acts as Jo's mentor in terms of leadership in the second season, and during it, she loses one of her tentacles when Fantos tears it off to use as a weapon and is forced to escape with the other aliens from Mo's Oasis Cafe when the cafe itself is being destroyed by Erodius. It was revealed that she was not able to pull her comrades out of Erodius' gravity on time, having to run away to Earth by creating a portal. She later returns in season three, finding the Global Heroes in the vacuum of space and providing refuge to them, later she appears as a customer at the newly rebuilt Mo's Oasis Cafe.
 Fred Tatasciore as:
 Great Leader, the evil, cowardly ruler of Stuck Chuck's people.
 Gortho the Gargarian, a yellow goblin-like creature who was the former bearer of the yellow Stone of Power. He died from being pulled by Erodius' gravity in a fateful battle where only Queen Xhan survives.
 Meep, a small light blue insect-like alien who was the former bearer of the blue Stone of Power. He died from being pulled by Erodius' gravity in a fateful battle where only Queen Xhan survives.
 Hamburg, a guy who works at Mo's Oasis Cafe and is usually seen with Fry. In the second season, he obtains the indigo Cosmic Stone of Power, giving him multiple arms.
 General Staunch, the General of a tiny civilization. He ordered his cadets to retreat when they learn the Global Heroes lost the Cosmic Stones, but he personally gives medals to the three cadets that helped Rosa to retrieve the Cosmic Stones back from Fantos.
 Eric Bauza as:
 Master Wilkson, a green humanoid alien with an enormous head and swirly eyes who was the former bearer of the green Stone of Power. He died from being pulled by Erodius' gravity in a fateful battle where only Queen Xhan survives.
 Fry, a man who works at Mo's Oasis Cafe and is usually seen together with Hamburg. In the second season, he obtains the light pink Cosmic Stone of Power, which gives the user the ability to stretch their body.
 Sam Riegel as PT-SB, a black and red robot who was the former bearer of the red Stone of Power. He died from being pulled by Erodius' gravity in a fateful battle where only Queen Xhan survives.
 Bobby Moynihan as Fantos the Amassor, an evil, immature fanboy of Erodius the Planet Killer, who is obsessed with obtaining all 13 Cosmic Stones of Power in order to help Erodius destroy the universe. He also lives with his mother and goes to her for emotional support. In the third season, he is absorbed into Erodius when its surface opened up and he sank into the goo like quicksand.
 Erodius the Planet Killer, a mysterious, sentient rogue planet that generates a powerful gravity well to destroy other planets and absorb them into its body as it travels in a single direction throughout the cosmos. it is possibly a reference to both Ego the Living Planet and Mogo. At the end of the second season, it seems to be defeated when the Local Heroes use the Goo and Growth Stones to cause it to explode from the inside. At the end of the third and final season, it's revealed it didn't explode and it was a living planet that was seeking the power of the fourteenth stone to restore itself to its original state, but it later redeems itself by showing the Local Heroes how it once used its power to heal injured and sick aliens because it used to be a sentient planet, but it got smashed into pieces by an asteroid and its consciousness survived and it only destroyed planets because it was searching for its last remaining fragment. It was permanently put to rest when Papa G sacrificed his Stone to it and it disappears afterwards returning home.
 April Winchell as Krosh, an alien warrior who was the previous champion of the Fight Hole. She allies temporally with Jo to beat Erodius but was killed by Fantos after trying to steal the Power Stones, when he vaporizes her and her duplicates into nothing but ash.
 Toks Olagundoye as Madame President, the leader of a tiny civilization whose planet was destroyed by Erodius and uses a room of Mo's Oasis Cafe to rebuild their civilization. At the end of the second season, they run away with Queen Xhan teleporting them to safety when Mo's Oasis Cafe is destroyed by Erodius. 
 Nicolas Cantu as Ensign Mainstay, the second on board of the tiny civilization that is cautious about the intentions of Flo until he realizes the big effort the Local Heroes did to save them.
 Phil LaMarr as Bombardier Brake
 Cathy Cavadini, Tara Strong and E. G. Daily as (respectively) Agent Pink, Agent Blue, and Agent Green of the PPG (Planet Protection Group), a new government agency who first appear at the end of the second season after the destruction of Erodius the Planet Killer. Their codenames, hairstyles, and actresses all refer to the eponymous characters of McCracken's first animated series, The Powerpuff Girls. But in the third and final season, they were revealed to be illusions created by the Global Heroes due to them being trapped in a fantasy world Fantos made to keep them out of his way.

Minor
 Mo, Flo's mother and Jo's grandmother who was the founder of Mo's Oasis Cafe. She died before the events of the series.
 Laura Bailey and Travis Willingham as Jane & Lionel Mulligan, Kid's deceased parents who were killed in a car collision by a semi-truck before the events of the series. Their deaths were so horrible that Kid was traumatized after that incident and said lethal accident was what caused Kid to dream of being a superhero. Additionally, Kid has developed PTSD and has occasionally shown signs of it in the series. They, like their son, liked superheroes and Kid's mother made the cape that Kid always wears, even today. They appeared in the third season as the final illusion Kid has to confront, realizing, with the help of Papa G that they were trapped in an illusion world created by Fantos and Kid's imagination.
 Fantos' mother, an elderly alien woman who is the mother of Fantos who he lives with and goes to for emotional support. In the second season finale "The World is Saved", she dumps his belongings and leaves her son on Erodius. In episode five of the third season titled "The Planet Killer", she is shown in a fantasy world, regretting her decision.
 Rich Fulcher as Zarkon, a small green alien and an adversary of Kid and his friends. Despite being easily able to defeat the Local Heroes and take the stones, he ends up getting electrocuted to death when he flies into a power line.
 Jennifer Hale as I.R.I.S (Integrated Robot Intelligence System), a female robot who controls everything in the PPG headquarters. In the episode "The Global Conspiracy", she became a robot, later Jo mentioned Carl staked I.R.I.S's "vampire" robot heart.
 Ike Amadi as Crispin Clearly, chief officer of the B.C.E.I.T.A.A (Bureau of Cosmic Events, Intergalactic Threats and Alien Affairs). He appeared in the series finale episode "The Grand Opening of Planet Earth" because he was sent by the I.C.P.P.P.P.E (International Council of Protection and Propagation on Planet Earth) to thank the Local Heroes for saving Earth from Erodius. But he forbids them from telling the world about their superhero adventures.
 Jack McBrayer as Skippy Olsen, an agent who works with the PPG and Kid's best pal who wanted to be like him. He appeared in the episode "The Secret of the Fourteenth Stone". He tricked the team that there's a fourteenth stone.

Episodes

Season 1: The Local Heroes! (2021) 
Each episode was directed by Craig McCracken, but various others co-direct with him.

Season 2: The Intergalactic Truckstop! (2021) 
Justin Nichols and Dave Thomas directs every episode, aside from "Kid Cosmic and the Pyramid Puzzle of Pain", which was solely directed by Thomas.

Season 3: The Global Heroes! (2022)
Like most of the previous season, Justin Nichols and Dave Thomas direct every episode.

Production
Upon completion of his Foster's Home for Imaginary Friends series in 2009, Craig McCracken planned a career in publishing his own comics or graphic novels, a more "intimate [and] direct approach to cartooning" in contrast to working with a large crew for a television network. During that time he made a comic strip entitled The Kid from Planet Earth, about a young boy who fantasized about becoming a superhero. He was inspired by the idea of how different reality would be if the character actually got the chance to fulfill such an aspiration. McCracken wanted to "tap into this naïve confidence that all kids have" of being a superhero, while also basing the concept on his early years of wanting to become a professional artist. He later realized that, in order to have the characters "learn, grow and change," he would have to tell the story with a serialized format. Knowing that "[no network] would want it at the time", he put the idea aside until 2015, when the industry of animation became more accepting of serialization within kids' animated series.

Along with his wife Lauren Faust and friend Francisco Angones, McCracken further expanded the idea into Kid Cosmic and ultimately produced an animatic for a 22-minute episode. Upon learning that Netflix were setting up an animation studio and was looking for new shows, he went to their studios on a Thursday and presented the animatic as a pilot. The executives supported the idea of a 22-minute family show, and greenlit the series the following Wednesday. "It was really quick and quite an incredible experience!", McCracken recalled in 2021.

McCracken and his old friend Rob Renzetti served as executive producers for the show. With the use of the Toon Boom Harmony software, Mercury Filmworks animated the show in Ottawa, Canada, with a staff of 110 employees. The company had done animation services previously for the first season of Wander Over Yonder, McCracken's previous creation. Netflix's animation division is leading production with a team of approximately 45 people. Having produced solely for television in the past, McCracken felt that he now had more creative freedom to pitch projects that had a darker tone or that could work as a movie, something that television channels "might shy away from". Due to the COVID-19 pandemic, the series team had to continue working at home since March 2020, slowing down the production process. According to McCracken, completing a season takes a year and a half of hard work, from writing start to finish.

Design and themes 
The main setting of the show, an arid landscape with a "generic rural southwest desert vibe", is presumed to be New Mexico. However, McCracken said in an interview for Den of Geek: "It could be New Mexico, it could be California [or] it could be Arizona. Basically it's a remote enough place where a spaceship could crash and not a lot of people would know about it."

Stylistically, the show is meant to resemble the visual look of classic comics such as Hank Ketcham's Dennis the Menace and Hergé's The Adventures of Tintin, where every action is grounded in reality: "A lot of the choices that we made in Kid were based on the fact that these are real people in the real world [...] So with the animation we avoided overly smooth and flowy actions or lots of squash and stretch, things that you associate with cartoons," the creator said. Stuck Chuck's design is a nod to the aliens from the 1996 film Mars Attacks! and other science-fiction movies. Spaceships, cars, and major locations like Mo's Oasis Café are often represented by 3D models.

McCracken affirmed that some of the ideas explored within the show are also based on things that he personally experienced, such as the loss of his father at the age of 7, similar to the protagonist, who lost both of his parents. The dynamics between Kid and Jo are loosely based on McCracken's relationship with his older sister and are similar to those of Mac and Frankie in Foster's Home for Imaginary Friends. Rosa's "playful spirit" is also a reflection of the creator's young daughter.

Kid Cosmic also plays on the theme that "heroes help, not hurt", which means the characters often show a compassionate attitude toward their adversaries. This strays in tone from McCracken's first popular work, The Powerpuff Girls, which he described as a "campy parody of superheroes". He declared: "I really didn't want to tell a story to kids that said, 'Hey, if you get great powers, then you can go and beat up bad guys and be violent and win.' I didn't want that to be the message. So I asked myself what a real hero is".

Music

In late February 2021, Netflix released a soundtrack album titled Kid Cosmic and the Sonic Courage. Under the name of the show's fictional "70's psychedelic garage punk band" Dr. Fang and the Gang, the soundtrack features music and songs of the first season written, composed and performed by multi-instrumentalist Andy Bean. He had previously written and composed the soundtrack for McCracken's third series Wander Over Yonder.

Release
Kid Cosmic was announced on November 6, 2018, along with other Netflix animated projects. A trailer was released on January 5, and the show debuted on February 2, 2021. Five companion shorts were released on the Netflix Features YouTube channel on February 3, 2021. The trailer for season 2 was released on August 10 of that year, with the episodes debuting later on September 7. The trailer for season 3 was released on the Netflix website at January 6, 2022 and on the official Netflix Futures YouTube channel  on January 13 of that year, with the last 6 episodes debuting later on February 3 of that year.

Reception
Kid Cosmic was met with positive reviews. On Rotten Tomatoes, the first season holds a 100% approval rating based on 6 reviews, with an average rating of 7.7/10.

Adrián Carande from the Spanish magazine Cinemanía called it "a little miracle [that is] flawlessly animated" and brings McCracken back to his roots, while being "sincere" "fast-paced", and "effective". IGN's Nicole Clark said that the first season wrapped up with the side characters lacking development, instead focusing on Kid's emotional process as a superhero. She also described him as "an extremely challenging character to sit with", and synthesized this season as a "merely entertaining show." Karen Han from Slate magazine said that the season "is all about opening the gates and letting people in", with the main team "finally finding its groove" and a cliffhanger ending. Vulture editor John Maher included the show as one of the stand-out animations from early 2021, praising the "patient character development, subtle world-building flourishes, and a willingness to explore just how hard it is to grow up." Likewise, Los Angeles Times named Kid Cosmic one of the 13 best TV shows of that year. Amanda Dyer of Common Sense Media described the series as a "fun superhero comedy teaches patience" but warned of the "mild violence." She also stated that character in the series learn "valuable lessons about teamwork and what makes a true superhero" and said the series is a "great option for family viewing" especially for those who grew up watching The Powerpuff Girls.

Awards and nominations

References

External links

2020s American animated television series
2020s American comic science fiction television series
2021 American television series debuts
2022 American television series endings
American children's animated action television series
American children's animated adventure television series
American children's animated comic science fiction television series
American children's animated superhero television series
Animated television series about orphans
Child superheroes
English-language Netflix original programming
Netflix children's programming
Television series by Netflix Animation
Television series created by Craig McCracken
Television shows about telekinesis
Television shows set in New Mexico
American flash animated television series
Animated television series about extraterrestrial life
Alien visitations in fiction
Children's and Family Emmy Award winners